The International Society for the Study of Vulvovaginal Disease (ISSVD) is a non-profit organization that was founded in 1970 at the Sixth World Congress of the International Federation of Obstetricians and Gynecologists (FIGO) in New York City. It is composed of health care professionals from different areas, including, gynecologists, dermatologists, general practitioners, physiotherapist, nurse practitioners, etc. devoted to the study, investigation, and treatment of vulvovaginal diseases.

The ISSVD regularly promotes and develops terminology, classification, and guidelines concerning these conditions. These include, among others: vulvar dermatosis (lichen sclerosus, lichen planus), vulvar pain (vulvodynia), vulvar intraepithelial neoplasia, etc. More recently, a guideline concerning female cosmetic genital surgery was published.

Presidents and world congresses

Terminology, classification, and guidelines

References

External links 

Non-profit organizations based in North Carolina
Obstetrics
Gynaecology
Scientific organizations established in 1970